Elegy for J.F.K. is a piece of vocal music composed by the Russian-born composer Igor Stravinsky in 1964, commemorating the assassination of U.S. President John F. Kennedy.

Composition background 
After the outbreak of World War II and his emigration to Los Angeles, California, in 1939, Stravinsky continued to work within the neo-classical framework he had adopted since about 1920 (following his Russian period of 1907–1919), but beginning in the early 1950s turned to various serial techniques, which he used until his death in 1971.

Music overview and analysis 
Elegy for J. F. K. is scored for baritone or mezzo-soprano accompanied by three clarinets (two B clarinets and an alto clarinet in E), and is a twelve-tone serial composition. The text, in four haiku stanzas each of 17 syllables, was written at Stravinsky's request by W. H. Auden in memory of assassinated President John F. Kennedy, and Stravinsky chose to repeat the opening stanza at the end. Elegy makes use of various textural changes to accommodate the changes in vocal register. The piece is in ternary form, just like the poem, meaning that material is repeated in the first and last nine measures.  Various compositional elements suggest the severity of the topic such as the frequent use of da capo, the perfect fifth D–A in the clarinets from mm. 7–8, and the repeated tritone G–D throughout.

Stravinsky composed the vocal line first, only adding the accompaniment afterward—a working method he likened to Schoenberg's in the Phantasie for violin and piano. The row Stravinsky uses for the Elegy,

is remarkable for the three tritones that occur in the first half. This row is related to the two rows Stravinsky previously used in the Bransles movement of Agon and at the words "Te Deum" in The Flood, by reordering the six pitch-class dyads in each row.

A twelve-tone analysis of this piece shows some patterns of the style. As in all twelve-tone music, there is a mathematical relationship between the prime, inverted, and retrograde series. For example, the melody pitches in mm. 1–8 are P0, and the harmonic pitches that the clarinets play are RI0 (D, C, A, A, G, F, B, C, F, E, D, and G), with some repeated pitches and the perfect fifth of D and A played in mm. 7 and 8. Stravinsky uses the P0 form in all of the measure rows except mm. 9–13 which uses RI0. The words for these measures have the lyrics "Why then? Why there? / Why thus, we cry, did he die?"

See also 
 Cultural depictions of John F. Kennedy

References 

Sources

Further reading 
 Auden, W. H. 1965. Collected Poems. New York: Random House
 Kuster, Andrew. 2000. "Stravinsky's Topology: An Examination of His Twelve-Tone Works through Object-Oriented Analysis of Structural and Poetic-Expressive Relationships with Special Attention to His Choral Works and Threni." D.M.A. diss. Boulder: University of Colorado. Published in 2005 as Stravinsky's Topology [N.p.]: Lulu.com. .
 Morgan, Robert. 1991. Twentieth-Century Music: A History of Musical Style in Modern Europe and America. The Norton Introduction to Music History. New York and London: W. W. Norton. .
 
 Straus, Joseph Nathan. 2001. Stravinsky's Late Music. Cambridge Studies in Music Theory and Analysis 16. New York: Cambridge University Press. .

External links 
 , Cathy Berberian (mezzo-soprano), members of the Orchestra Filarmonica Romana, Pierre Boulez conducting
 Zambrotta, Luisa, ""Elegy to J.F.K.", Words and Music and Stories, November 25, 2017
 Work details, Boosey & Hawkes

Compositions by Igor Stravinsky
1964 compositions
Works about the assassination of John F. Kennedy
Funerary and memorial compositions
Compositions for clarinet